Alvin Henry is a former track and field athlete notable for being on Trinidad and Tobago's 4 × 100 metres relay team at the 2000 Summer Olympics. While part of the team, Henry did not actually compete in the event. He was bronze medallist with the relay team at the 2002 Central American and Caribbean Games.

On July 1, 2007, Henry was arrested in New York City for the rape of five women including one 15-year-old girl. He confessed to the charges: he attacked three women in Baisley Pond Park and Roy Wilkins Park in Queens and two others in Prospect Park ;the latest attack was on June 15, 2007 in Prospect Park where police say he raped a 34-year-old woman at gunpoint.

On August 8, 2008, Henry pleaded guilty in exchange for a 21-year prison sentence.

International competitions

See also
Trinidad and Tobago at the 2000 Summer Olympics

References

Year of birth missing (living people)
Trinidad and Tobago male sprinters
Living people
Trinidad and Tobago people convicted of rape
Central American and Caribbean Games bronze medalists for Trinidad and Tobago
Competitors at the 2002 Central American and Caribbean Games
Central American and Caribbean Games medalists in athletics
Violence against women in Trinidad and Tobago